WMT (600 kHz) is a news/talk AM radio station broadcasting in Cedar Rapids, Iowa, in the United States. It is owned by iHeartMedia, Inc. The station's signal reaches most of Iowa and portions of neighboring states during daylight hours.  WMT broadcasts on a Regional AM broadcast frequency, according to the Federal Communications Commission.

WMT's studios co-located with former sister station KGAN-TV near the intersection of Collins Road (Iowa Highway 100)/C Avenue NE/Old Marion Road NE in Cedar Rapids, in a building known as "Broadcast Park", while its 2-tower transmitter array is located on Radio Road near Marion.

History
WMT was founded by Douglas "Tex" Perham as WJAM on July 30, 1922. In 1928, Harry Shaw purchased WJAM and moved the station from Cedar Rapids to Waterloo, renaming it WMT (for the now-defunct Waterloo Morning Tribune newspaper that he owned). Shaw sold the station to the Cowles family, owners of the Des Moines Register, in October 1934. WMT moved back to Cedar Rapids the next year, occupying the studios of the defunct KWCR radio after KWCR's frequency was taken over by KSO in Des Moines, another Cowles station. (WMT continued to operate a secondary studio in Waterloo until 1947.) The Cowleses sold WMT to Delaware-based American Broadcasting Stations in 1944.

WMT-TV, the first television station in Cedar Rapids, signed on at channel 2 on September 30, 1953. On February 27, 1963, WMT-FM (now KKSY-FM) debuted at 96.5 MHz with the same song, "Don't Send Me Posies When It's Shoesies That I Need," that was played on the AM station's inaugural broadcast 41 years earlier.

Ownership of the WMT stations was passed on to Orion Broadcasting of Louisville, Kentucky, in 1968. In 1981, Cosmos Broadcasting of Greenville, South Carolina, purchased WMT-AM and FM; they had also planned to purchase WMT-TV, but the television station was sold to Guy Gannett Communications (who renamed it KGAN) because of ownership restrictions at the time. (WMT and KGAN continue to broadcast from the same building on Collins Road, known as "Broadcast Park"; however, WMT now gets its weather reports from KCRG-TV.)

An ownership group that included former Iowa governor Robert D. Ray and sportscaster Forrest "Frosty" Mitchell purchased WMT on October 1, 1986. On January 1, 1996, Palmer Communications (owners of WHO radio in Des Moines) acquired WMT; WHO and WMT were later sold to Jacor Broadcasting, which was eventually acquired by current owner Clear Channel Communications.

Beginning January 2, 2012, WMT began simulcasting on KWMG (95.7 FM) in Anamosa; this simulcast ended on August 18, 2014.

Personalities and programming
Current local talk shows on WMT (as of Spring 2019) include "The Morning Show" with Doug Wagner, "Need To Know" with Jeff Angelo, "The Simon Conway Show," and "Ask The Expert." Erick Zamora is the Program Director for the station, and serves as a substitute host for programming.

A long running weekend show is The Open Line, where listeners have shared recipes since 1963. The current host for that program is Doug Wagner. Also on the weekend, WMT originates and syndicates "The My Car Geek Hour" with Jay Cassill. 
During the week, WMT simulcasts The Big Show with Bob Quinn and Andy Petersen with sister station WHO. Syndicated talk show hosts include The Clay Travis and Buck Sexton Show, Dave Ramsey, Jim Bohannon, George Noory's Coast to Coast AM, and The Kim Komando Show.

WMT has also been a longtime home for Iowa Hawkeyes football and basketball games. Play-by-play announcers over the years included Lawson "Tait" Cummins (a former sportswriter with The Gazette), Ron Gonder, Frosty Mitchell, and Gary Dolphin, who has handled the play-by-play duties since Learfield Communications was granted the exclusive broadcast rights to Hawkeye sports in 1997.

Saturday programming features "The Iowa Lawn and Garden Show," hosted by Doug Wagner, with guests From Culver's Garden Center.

References

  (Retrieved on 2006-08-01 via Newsbank.)

External links
FCC History Cards for WMT

Mass media in Cedar Rapids, Iowa
IHeartMedia radio stations
µ
Radio stations established in 1922
1922 establishments in Iowa
News and talk radio stations in the United States
Radio stations licensed before 1923 and still broadcasting